Trello is a web-based, kanban-style, list-making application and is developed by Trello Enterprise, a subsidiary of Atlassian. Created in 2011 by Fog Creek Software, it was spun out to form the basis of a separate company in New York City in 2014 and sold to Atlassian in January 2017.

History 
The name Trello is derived from the word "trellis" which had been a code name for the project at its early stages. Trello was released at a TechCrunch event by Fog Creek founder Joel Spolsky. In September 2011 Wired magazine named the application one of "The 7 Coolest Startups You Haven't Heard of Yet". Lifehacker said "it makes project collaboration simple and kind of enjoyable".

In 2014, it raised US$10.3 million in funding from Index Ventures and Spark Capital. Prior to its acquisition, Trello had sold 22% of its shares to investors, with the remaining shares held by founders Michael Pryor and Joel Spolsky. In May 2016, Trello claimed it had more than 1.1 million daily active users and 14 million total signups. 

In 2016 Trello launched the Power-Up platform, allowing 3rd party developers to build and distribute extensions known as Power-Ups to Trello. Initial integrations included Zendesk, SurveyMonkey and Giphy. By January 2022 there were a total of 247 power-ups listed in the power-up directory. 

On January 9, 2017, Atlassian announced its intent to acquire Trello for $425 million. The transaction was made with $360 million in cash and $65 million in shares and options. 

In December 2018, Trello Enterprise announced its acquisition of Butler, a company that developed a leading power-up for automating tasks within a Trello board. 

Trello announced 35 million users in March 2019 and 50 million users in October 2019.

Uses 
Users can create their task boards with different columns and move the tasks between them. Typically columns include task statuses such as To Do, In Progress, Done. The tool can be used for personal and business purposes including real estate management, software project management, school bulletin boards, lesson planning, accounting, web design, gaming, and law office case management.

Architecture 
According to a Glitch blog post in January 2012, the client was a thin web layer which downloads the main app, written in CoffeeScript and compiled to minified JavaScript, using Backbone.js, HTML5 .pushState(), and the Mustache templating language. The server was built on top of MongoDB, Node.js and a modified version of Socket.io.

Reception 
On January 26, 2017, PC Magazine gave Trello a 3.5 / 5 rating, calling it "flexible" and saying that "you can get rather creative", while noting that "it may require some experimentation to figure out how to best use it for your team and the workload you manage."

See also
 Comparison of scrum software
 Comparison of project management software
 Kanban board
 List of collaborative software
 Tech companies in the New York metropolitan area

References

External links

 

Android (operating system) software
Wear OS software
Atlassian products
Internet properties established in 2011
IOS software
Project management software
Task management software
Windows software
Web applications
2017 mergers and acquisitions